Read Music/Speak Spanish is the first studio album by American punk band Desaparecidos. Released in February 2002, the record is the forty-second release of Saddle Creek Records. Reviews were mostly positive upon release.

About 
Read Music/Speak Spanish is a punk/indie-rock concept album loosely centered on perceived American materialism and greed. Song topics include the pressures of upward mobility on marriage, the suburban expansion of Omaha, the desire to always follow the latest fashion or fad, the effect of consumerism on developing countries, and the mixture of religion and politics.

The album was recorded in one week, the same week of the September 11 attacks. Since the concept of the album is a criticism of American consumerism, the band considered not releasing it and partly due to this timing the album failed commercially. Despite its lack of commercial success, the album gained an extensive cult following.

Track listing

International version

Personnel 
 Conor Oberst - vocals, guitar
 Denver Dalley - guitar
 Ian McElroy - keyboards
 Landon Hedges - bass, vocals
 Matt Baum - drums

References

External links
Saddle Creek Records
Desaparecidos website

2002 albums
Desaparecidos (band) albums
Saddle Creek Records albums